Ochyrotica borneoica is a moth of the family Pterophoridae. It is known from Borneo and the Sulu Archipelago.

The wingspan is 14–15 mm. Adults have been recorded in September, October and December on Borneo.

References

Ochyroticinae
Moths described in 1988